Roger James may refer to:

 Roger James (footballer) (born 1975), former Australian rules footballer
 Roger James (Blessed) (died 1539), Roman Catholic martyr
 Sir Roger James (died 1636) (1589–1636), English landowner and politician
 Roger James (died 1700) (1640–1700), English landowner and politician
 Roger James (producer) (1944–2015), producer of television documentaries
 Roger James (horse trainer), New Zealand thoroughbred race horse trainer